The 2012–13 Charlotte 49ers men's basketball team represented the University of North Carolina at Charlotte during the 2012–13 NCAA Division I men's basketball season. The 49ers, led by head coach Alan Major, played their home games at the Dale F. Halton Arena and were members of the Atlantic 10 Conference. This was their final year in the Atlantic 10 Conference as they move to Conference USA in 2014. They finished the season 21–12, 8–8 in A-10 play to finish in a three way tie for eighth place. They lost in the quarterfinals of the Atlantic 10 tournament to Saint Louis. They were invited to the 2013 NIT where they lost in the first round to Providence.

Roster

Schedule

|-
!colspan=12 style="background:#00703C; color:#FFFFFF;"| Exhibition

|-
!colspan=12 style="background:#00703C; color:#FFFFFF;"| Non-Conference

|-
!colspan=12 style="background:#00703C; color:#FFFFFF;"|Atlantic 10 Regular Season

|-
!colspan=12 style="background:#00703C; color:#FFFFFF;"|2013 Atlantic 10 Men's Basketball Tournament

|-
!colspan=12 style="background:#00703C; color:#FFFFFF;"| 2013 National Invitation Tournament

References

Charlotte
Charlotte 49ers men's basketball seasons
Charlotte